Rita Ciresi (born in New Haven, Connecticut) is an American short story writer, and novelist of Itialian descent.

Life
She graduated from Pennsylvania State University with an M.F.A. She teaches at the University of South Florida.

Her work appeared in Oregon Review, Prairie Schooner, South Carolina Review.

Awards
 2002 Flannery O'Connor Award for Short Fiction, for Mother Rocket
 1993 Los Angeles Times' Art Seidenbaum Award for First Fiction
 2004 American Academy in Rome visiting writer
 2005 Hawthornden International Writers’ Retreat fellowship in Lasswade, Scotland

Works
Bring Back My Body to Me | year=2012|
    (paperback by Delacorte Press in 1997)
    (Delta Trade paperbacks in 2000)

Anthologies

   (reprint HarperCollins, 2005)

References

External links
"Author's website"

Writers from New Haven, Connecticut
20th-century American novelists
Year of birth missing (living people)
Living people
American writers of Italian descent
University of South Florida faculty
Pennsylvania State University alumni
21st-century American novelists
American women novelists
20th-century American women writers
21st-century American women writers
20th-century American short story writers
21st-century American short story writers
Novelists from Florida
Novelists from Connecticut
American women academics